Histoire du Tango  is one of the most famous compositions by tango composer Ástor Piazzolla, originally composed for flute and guitar in 1985 (published 1986). It is often played with different combinations, including violin or double bass substituted for the flute, and also harp or marimba substituted for the guitar. 

It was Piazzolla's life work to bring the tango from the bordellos and dance halls of Argentina into the concert halls of Europe and America. He is among the astonishingly varied group of composers who were enabled by the teaching of Nadia Boulanger to become more authentically themselves. Boulanger – doyenne of high European art – encouraged Piazzolla not to become another European-style composer, but to apply to the tango the lessons of his study with her. Piazzolla's Histoire du Tango is his only work for flute and guitar – the instruments associated with the first flowering of the form, in Buenos Aires in 1882. 

Histoire du Tango attempts to convey the history and evolution of the tango in four movements: Bordello 1900, Café 1930, Nightclub 1960, and Concert d'Aujourd'hui. Piazzolla provided program notes that expand on the individual movements:

Bordello, 1900: The tango originated in Buenos Aires in 1882. It was first played on the guitar and flute. Arrangements then came to include the piano, and later, the concertina. This music is full of grace and liveliness. It paints a picture of the good natured chatter of the French, Italian, and Spanish women who peopled those bordellos as they teased the policemen, thieves, sailors, and riffraff who came to see them. This is a high-spirited tango.

Cafe, 1930: This is another age of the tango. People stopped dancing it as they did in 1900, preferring instead simply to listen to it. It became more musical, and more romantic. This tango has undergone total transformation: the movements are slower, with new and often melancholy harmonies. Tango orchestras come to consist of two violins, two concertinas, a piano, and a bass. The tango is sometimes sung as well.

Night Club, 1960: This is a time of rapidly expanding international exchange, and the tango evolves again as Brazil and Argentina come together in Buenos Aires. The bossa nova and the new tango are moving to the same beat. Audiences rush to the night clubs to listen earnestly to the new tango. This marks a revolution and a profound alteration in some of the original tango forms.

Modern-Day Concert: Certain concepts in tango music become intertwined with modern music. Bartok, Stravinsky, and other composers reminisce to the tune of tango music. This [is] today’s tango, and the tango of the future as well.

References

Compositions by Ástor Piazzolla
1986 compositions
Compositions for flute
Compositions for guitar